D&C or D and C or variant, may refer to:

 Dilation and curettage, a medical procedure involving the dilation of the cervix to remove uterine contents
 Divide and conquer algorithm, a strategy for dynamic programming
 Doctrine and Covenants, part of the scripture of the Latter Day Saint movement
 Drill & Ceremony, a term used in the U.S. Army for a method that enables leaders to direct the movement of soldiers in an orderly manner.
 Dennis and Callahan, an American morning radio show
 Democrat and Chronicle, a Rochester, New York, daily newspaper

See also

 Divide and conquer (disambiguation)
 DNC (disambiguation)
 DC (disambiguation)
 D (disambiguation)
 C (disambiguation)
 C&D (disambiguation)